The Capture is a British mystery thriller series created, written and directed by Ben Chanan, and starring Holliday Grainger, Callum Turner, Laura Haddock, Ben Miles, Cavan Clerkin, Paul Ritter, and Ron Perlman.

The series premiered on BBC One on 3 September 2019, and received positive reviews from critics. It was announced in June 2020 that a second series had been commissioned. The second series began airing on BBC One in the UK on 28 August 2022 and it also premiered on Peacock in the US on 3 November 2022.

Premise
In series one, after being acquitted of a war crime in Afghanistan, former British army Lance Corporal Shaun Emery finds himself accused of kidnapping and murdering his barrister Hannah Roberts, backed by CCTV evidence. Whilst Emery works to clear his name, fast-tracked Detective Inspector Rachel Carey of Homicide and Serious Crime Command begins to uncover a complex conspiracy surrounding Emery, calling into question the validity of the footage.

In series two, rising politician Isaac Turner finds himself caught up in a similar conspiracy after a deepfake of him causes yet another race against time for Rachel to expose the truth before it is too late.

Cast

Main
 Holliday Grainger as DI/DCI Rachel Carey
 Cavan Clerkin as DS Patrick Flynn
 Ginny Holder as DS/DI Nadia Latif
 Ben Miles as Commander Danny Hart
 Ron Perlman as CIA Section Chief Frank Napier
 Lia Williams as DSU Gemma Garland
 Nigel Lindsay as DCI Tom Kendricks
 Daisy Waterstone as Abigail Carey, Rachel's half-sister
 Peter Singh as DI Phillips, later seconded to the CIA

Series 1
 Callum Turner as Lance Corporal Shaun Emery
 Sophia Brown as Karen Merville, Emery's ex-girlfriend 
 Paul Ritter as Marcus Levy
 Famke Janssen as CIA Executive Consultant Jessica Mallory
 Ralph Ineson as DCI Alec Boyd
 Laura Haddock as Hannah Roberts, Emery's barrister 
 Barry Ward as Charlie Hall, Emery's solicitor
 Tommy McDonnell as Matt, Sean Emery's best friend
 Alan Williams as Eddie Emery

Series 2
 Paapa Essiedu as Isaac Turner, Security Minister and MP for Hazlemere South
 Indira Varma as Khadija Khan, presenter of Newsnight
 Andy Nyman as Home Secretary Rowan Gill 
 Rob Yang as Yan Wanglei, UK head of Chinese artificial intelligence company XANDA
 Charlie Murphy as Simone Turner, Isaac's wife
 Tessa Wong as DC Chloe Tan
 Harry Michell as Rhys Edwards, a political aide
 Natalie Dew as Aliza Clarke, a political aide
 Joseph Arkley as Gregory Knox, CEO of Truro Analytics
 Angus Wright as Anthony Reed, OBE, BBC security correspondent

Production

Filming locations
Production filmed interior scenes at Canterbury Prison, Kent, England doubling as HMP Gladstone, London for episode one. Lead character Shaun Emery (Callum Turner) is released from prison wearing a soldier's uniform. He later is rearrested and returns to the prison.

Other interior scenes were filmed at the Printworks venue in Rotherhithe, and The Shard.

Series 2 of The Capture began airing on BBC One on Sunday 28 August 2022.

Episodes

Series 1

Series 2

Reception

Critical response

Series 1 
The first series was reviewed positively by critics. On Rotten Tomatoes, it has an approval rating of 92% with an average rating of 8.1/10, based on reviews from 39 critics. The site's critical consensus said, "Gripping to the very end, The Capture's well-built tension culminates in a riveting revitalization of a tired genre". On Metacritic, which uses a weighted average, it received a score of 72 out of 100 based on 20 critic reviews, indicating "generally favorable reviews".

The Telegraph awarded the episode four stars, labelling the series as "riveting", and The Independent also awarded it four stars, designating it an "intriguing, but rather flawed, sort of Big Brother thriller set in our contemporary world of digital snooping". In his review in The Times James Jackson referred to the drama as a "neatly structured thriller... clearly out to interrogate surveillance culture", also awarding four stars. The Guardian was less enthusiastic, concluding it to be a "twisty if lacklustre drama", giving the opening episode only three stars out of five.

Reviews improved over the course of the series, and the finale was highly praised by critics, with many drawing positive comparisons with the BBC's similar series Bodyguard which was broadcast around the same time the previous year. The Telegraph described it as a "highly satisfying series finale", whilst The Times critic James Jackson referred to the series as 'the thinking man's' Bodyguard:

Sarah Hughes echoed these sentiments in her review of the finale in The Guardian, commenting that "if there were any justice, everyone would be talking about The Capture right now". She heralded the show as "nuanced and complex" and "one of the most cleverly plotted dramas of recent years", and the final episode as "a refreshingly grownup hour of television".

Series 2 
On Rotten Tomatoes, the second series received an approval rating of 100% with an average rating of 7.8/10, based on 12 critics. The site's critical consensus said, "Deftly melding contemporary concerns with outlandish internal logic, The Capture's sophomore season is brainy camp that will detain your attention." On Metacritic, it received an average score of 70 out of 100, based on four critic reviews.

Viewership 

The Capture was the most requested new show in 2019 on BBC iPlayer, with over 20 million requests for series 1. It was also the eighth most requested series overall in 2019.

Accolades 

For his performance in the first series, Callum Turner received a nomination for the British Academy Television Award for Best Actor.

References

External links 
 
 
 

BBC television dramas
English-language television shows
2019 British television series debuts
2010s British crime television series
2010s British drama television series
2010s British mystery television series
2020s British crime television series
2020s British drama television series
2020s British mystery television series
British thriller television series
Television series by Universal Television
Deepfakes